Qattara may refer to:
 Qattara Depression, Libyan Desert basin in north-western Egypt
 Qattara Gecko, species of lizard 
 Qattara Oasis within the UAE city of Al Ain
 il-Qattara locality in Rabat, Malta
 Qattara (or:Karana), an ancient city in northern Iraq, in Ninawa (Nineveh) province, in Sinjar region, modern day name: Tell al-Rimah